Anna Ramona Papaioannou (born 15 June 1989) is a Cypriot sprinter. She competed in the 60 metres event at the 2014 IAAF World Indoor Championships. Her father is the Greek-Brazilian football player Pavlos Papaioannou.

International competitions

1Did not finish in the semifinals

Personal bests
Outdoor
100 metres – 11.25 (+1.1 m/s, Nicosia 2016) NR
200 metres – 23.10 (+0.0 m/s, Rio de Janeiro 2016)
Indoor
60 metres – 7.33 (Piraeus 2014) NR

References

External links
 

1989 births
Living people
Cypriot female sprinters
Athletes from Athens
Greek Cypriot people
Cypriot people of Brazilian descent
World Athletics Championships athletes for Cyprus
Athletes (track and field) at the 2014 Commonwealth Games
Athletes (track and field) at the 2018 Commonwealth Games
Commonwealth Games competitors for Cyprus
Athletes (track and field) at the 2016 Summer Olympics
Olympic athletes of Cyprus
Athletes (track and field) at the 2013 Mediterranean Games
Mediterranean Games silver medalists for Cyprus
Greek people of Brazilian descent
Mediterranean Games medalists in athletics
European Games competitors for Cyprus
Athletes (track and field) at the 2019 European Games
Olympic female sprinters